Futbolo klubas Hegelmann, commonly known as Hegelmann, is a Lithuanian football club located in Kaunas. They play in the A Lyga, the first tier of Lithuanian football.

History
The club was founded at the beginning of 2009 by Hegelmann Transporte, a German-owned freight forwarding and logistics company. Hegelmann refers to the family name of Anton Hegelmann and Litauen means Lithuania in German.

After promotion from II Lyga in 2018, the club took 7th place in 2019 LFF I Lyga. Despite this fact, the club lodged an application to play in A Lyga in 2020. The club later withdrew the application. But in 2021, when  [A Lyga got ten teams format back, club being second in I Lyga got promoted into highest Lithuanian division.

In January 2022 club changed logo and official name to Football Club Hegelmann from Football Club Hegelmann Litauen. After regular season of the A lyga Hegelmann Club was at 4th position and was qualificated for the Europa Conference League (first qualifying round).

Honours
 II Lyga Southern Zone
 Winners: 2018

Recent seasons

Kit evolution

Colors 
 2012 – now.

Stadium
Club play their home matches in NFA Stadium. The current capacity of the stadium is 500 seats.

Current squad

Notable and famous players
FC Hegelmann Litauen players who have either appeared for their respective national team at any time or received an individual award while at the club.

Lithuania
 Ignas Dedura (2020)
 Mantas Fridrikas (2020–)
 Vilius Armanavičius (2020–)
 Augustinas Klimavičius (2022–)
 Tomas Švedkauskas (2023–)

References

External links
 Official site
 FC Hegelmann in Facebook

Football clubs in Lithuania
Football clubs in Kaunas
Association football clubs established in 2009